"The Healing Game" is the title song on Northern Irish singer-songwriter Van Morrison's 1997 album.
It was released twice as a single in 1997 as an A-side with different B-sides – including "Have I Told You Lately" and "Gloria". The single reached number 46 in the UK.

Recording and composition
"The Healing Game" was recorded in 1996 at Windmill Lane Studios in Dublin with Walter Samuel as engineer.

Morrison explains the song in Q Magazine as: "The song is about when people used to sing on the streets:  It came from America,  where they had all the doo-wop groups.  That's the general idea of the song: you've never really moved from this position.  You took a lot of detours but you're still back on the corner."

Brian Hinton remarks on the song: "Van is like the protagonists in Yeats play, Purgatorial, condemned to eternal recurrence, 'here I am again', back with the 'backstreet jelly roll'....only music can assuage."

Other releases
"The Healing Game" is one of the songs on disc one of the 2007 compilation album, The Best of Van Morrison Volume 3. It is also included as one of the hits on Morrison's third compilation album issued in 2007 — Still on Top - The Greatest Hits. It is listed as an alternate take and appears on both the 2-CD album issued in the UK and also the single disc –  21 hit album released in the US on 6 November 2007.

Personnel
Van Morrison – vocals
Georgie Fame – Hammond organ, backing vocals
Ronnie Johnson – electric guitar
Nicky Scott – electric bass
Alec Dankworth – double bass
Leo Green – tenor saxophone, backing vocals
Ralph Salmins – percussion
Geoff Dunn – drums
Pee Wee Ellis – baritone saxophone, backing vocals
Matt Holland – trumpet, backing vocals
Haji Ahkba – flugelhorn
Robin Aspland – piano
Brian Kennedy – backing vocals
Horns arranged by – Leo Green and Matt Holland

Covers
John Lee Hooker recorded a duet of this song with Van Morrison and included it on his 1997 album, Don't Look Back.

Charts

References

Other reading
Heylin, Clinton (2003). Can You Feel the Silence? Van Morrison: A New Biography, Chicago Review Press 
Hinton, Brian (1997). Celtic Crossroads: The Art of Van Morrison, Sanctuary, 

1996 songs
1997 singles
Van Morrison songs
Polydor Records singles
Songs written by Van Morrison
Song recordings produced by Van Morrison